A by-election was held for the New South Wales Legislative Assembly seat of Earlwood on 15 July 1978 because of the resignation of Sir Eric Willis the former Premier of New South Wales.

Result

Sir Eric Willis resigned.

See also
Electoral results for the district of Earlwood
List of New South Wales state by-elections

References

New South Wales state by-elections
1978 elections in Australia
1970s in New South Wales
July 1978 events in Australia